Ryan Scott Lewis (born March 25, 1988) is an American record producer, DJ, videographer, photographer, graphic designer, music video director, rapper, and songwriter. Along with producing his own album, Instrumentals, Lewis produced the albums The VS. EP (2009), The Heist (2012), and This Unruly Mess I've Made (2016) as part of the duo Macklemore & Ryan Lewis. In 2006, Lewis befriended rapper Macklemore on Myspace and soon after became the behind-the-scenes partner of a successful duo, producing, recording, engineering and mixing all of the duo's music, as well as directing the music videos for "Same Love", "Thrift Shop", "And We Danced", "Otherside (Remix)", "Can't Hold Us", "Irish Celebration", "My Oh My", "Victory Lap", "Downtown", "Brad Pitt's Cousin" and "White Walls" and designing promotional graphics.

Early life
Ryan Lewis was born on March 25, 1988, to Julie and Scott Lewis. Lewis has two sisters, Teresa and Laura, four years and two years older than he is, respectively. At an early age, he played guitar in rock bands with his childhood best friend Ryan Sanson, and nursed a growing interest in music production around the age of 15. Lewis attended Ferris High School in Spokane, Washington, and graduated from Roosevelt High School in Seattle. He graduated from the University of Washington majoring in Comparative History of Ideas.

Career

2006–2008: Career beginnings
Lewis became a professional photographer and videographer. In 2008, he released his debut extended play, Instrumentals, with four alternative hip hop songs. In the same year, Lewis collaborated with Rhode Island-based emcee Symmetry in a self-titled work, released as an LP.

2009–2017: Career with Macklemore

Lewis first met Macklemore in 2006, but only in 2009 did they formalize the collaboration as the duo Macklemore & Ryan Lewis and release the EP The VS. EP.

In October 2010, Lewis produced the VS. Redux EP and, in December, their debut single, "My Oh My". "Wings" was released on January 21, 2011, followed by "Can't Hold Us" featuring Ray Dalton on August 16, 2011.

Their album The Heist was released in October 2012. 
Previously released singles "My Oh My", "Wings", and "Can't Hold Us" were announced to be included on the album – as was the song "Make the Money". "Can't Hold Us" was used as soundtrack for a Miller beer ad in UK and Ireland in June 2012. "Same Love" was released on July 18, 2012, and songs "White Walls" featuring Schoolboy Q and "Jimmy Iovine" featuring Ab-Soul were confirmed to be included on the album. The Heist debuted on the US Billboard 200 at number 2.

On October 30, 2012, Lewis appeared on The Ellen DeGeneres Show performing their single "Same Love" and then again on 18 January 2013, performing their single "Thrift Shop", which they had sung previously on Late Night with Jimmy Fallon on 11 December 2012. The song topped the Billboard Hot 100 for six weeks, giving them their first number 1 hit in the US.

The Heist World Tour began in August 2012 to promote The Heist.

On January 26, 2014, Macklemore performed "Same Love" at the 56th Annual Grammy Awards, where Queen Latifah read marriage vows for 33 couples who lined the aisles, including Lewis's sister, Laura, and her now husband.

In January 2015, Lewis announced via Twitter that his third studio album would be released sometime in the second half of the year. On August 5, 2015, Macklemore released a song for free download titled "Growing Up (Sloane's Song)", which features Ed Sheeran.

On August 27, 2015, the duo released "Downtown", featuring Eric Nally, Kool Moe Dee, Melle Mel, and Grandmaster Caz; it was performed at the 2015 MTV Video Music Awards on 30 August. "Downtown" is part of their new album, This Unruly Mess I've Made, which was released on February 26, 2016.

On January 22, 2016, the duo released "White Privilege II", the second single on "This Unruly Mess I've Made". On June 15, 2017, Macklemore announced via his official Instagram that the duo were on hiatus.

2017–present: Other works
July 2017 saw the release of Kesha's song "Praying", which Lewis co-wrote and produced.

On August 19, 2019, Hobo Johnson's song "Subaru Crosstrek XV" was released, which Lewis co-wrote and produced.

Discography

Studio albums

Extended plays

Remixes
 "Vipassana (Ryan Lewis Remix)" by Macklemore & Ryan Lewis; from the VS. Redux EP
 "Otherside (Ryan Lewis Remix)" by Macklemore & Ryan Lewis featuring Fences; from VS. Redux

See also
List of awards and nominations received by Macklemore & Ryan Lewis

References

External links
 

 
1988 births
American male rappers
American hip hop record producers
Grammy Award winners for rap music
Musicians from Seattle
Living people
University of Washington College of Arts and Sciences alumni
Musicians from Spokane, Washington
American LGBT rights activists
Pop rappers